Painkillers is a 2018 Belgian drama thriller film directed by Roxy Shih and written by Giles Daoust. The film stars Adam Huss, Madeline Zima and Mischa Barton. It was produced by Lone Suspect and Title Media. Kew Media acquired the title to present it to distributors at the European Film Market in Berlin in February 2018. The film premiered on 12 April 2018 at the Brussels International Fantastic Film Festival. It had a limited theatrical release in the United States on 31 January 2019 before becoming available on VOD platforms on 4 February.

Plot summary
Plagued by guilt following the death of his son in a car crash, John Clarke (Huss), a brilliant surgeon, is visited by the mysterious Herb Morris, who explains that Clarke has contracted an extremely rare form of PTSD, and the only thing that can ease his current pain is the taste of human blood.

Cast
Adam Huss as John Clarke
Madeline Zima as Chloe Clarke
Mischa Barton as Sarah Mendelsohn
Naomi Grossman as Nurse Sheralyn
Grant Bowler as Herb Morris
Debra Wilson as Gail Konrad

References

External links
 

2018 films
2018 thriller drama films
Belgian thriller drama films
2018 drama films
2010s English-language films